The Punjabi Wikipedia is the Punjabi language edition of Wikipedia, the free encyclopedia. There are two Punjabi Wikipedia editions viz. Eastern Punjabi Wikipedia (in Gurmukhi script) and Western Punjabi Wikipedia (in Shahmukhi script).

Eastern edition 
The Eastern edition domain came into existence on June 3, 2002 but the first three articles were only written in August 2004. In July 2012, it had reached 2,400 articles.

Since August 2012, it has about 26 million readers from all over the world.

The first Punjabi Wikipedia workshop was organized in Ludhiana on July 28, 2012 and later another on August 16, 2012 at the Punjabi University in Patiala to inform people how to edit and add to the Wiki.

Wiki-events and workshops to improve this Wikipedia and increase number of editors are conducted on regular basis. In October 2015 a seminar was organised at an event in Amritsar, where 148 students from 17 schools participated. The aim of the seminar to increase awareness about Wikipedia among the students.

There are currently  articles on the Gurmukhi Punjabi Wikipedia.

Western edition 

The Western edition was started on 24 October 2008 via the Wikimedia Incubator, and its domain came into existence on August 13, 2009. The project was pioneered by Khalid Mahmood, a college professor from Islamabad.

There are currently  articles on the Shahmukhi Punjabi Wikipedia.

See also 
 Hindi Wikipedia
 Urdu Wikipedia
 Marathi Wikipedia
 Saraiki Wikipedia
 Sindhi Wikipedia
 Pashto Wikipedia
 Gujarati Wikipedia
 English Wikipedia

References

External links

Eastern Punjabi Wikipedia
Western Punjabi Wikipedia

Languages on Wikipedia
Wikipedias by language
Internet properties established in 2002
Internet properties established in 2009
Wikipedia
Punjabi-language mass media